The following lists the number one albums on the New Zealand Albums Chart during the 1990s. The source for this decade is the Recording Industry Association of New Zealand.

1990 

Key
 – Album of New Zealand origin

1991 

Key
 – Album of New Zealand origin

1992 

Key
 – Album of New Zealand origin

1993 

Key
 – Album of New Zealand origin

1994 

Key
 – Album of New Zealand origin

1995 

Key
 – Album of New Zealand origin

1996 

Key
 – Album of New Zealand origin

1997 

Key
 – Album of New Zealand origin

1998 

Key
 – Album of New Zealand origin

1999 

Key
 – Album of New Zealand origin

Notes 

This album is of New Zealand origin

References 

 Album Top 40 – Charts.org.nz

External links 

 The Official NZ Music Charts

1990s
New Zealand albums
1990s in New Zealand music